Johnny du Plooy (27 September 1964 – 12 April 2013) was a former South African heavyweight boxer best known for his win over former WBA World Heavyweight champion Mike Weaver. He challenged once for the WBO World Heavyweight title in 1989.

Boxing career

Amateur career
du Plooy had a very impressive amateur record of 196-4.

Professional career
The tall 6'3 South African boxer began his career in 1985 with 17 straight wins. He then lost to ex-champ Mike Weaver by 7th round KO. He later avenged this defeat by knocking out Mike Weaver in two rounds and in 1989 challenged Francesco Damiani for the vacant WBO heavyweight title. Du Plooy was knocked out in the third round in the World Boxing Organization's inaugural heavyweight world title bout. After this, he fought 15 more fights, compiling an overall record of 27 wins, 5 losses, and 1 draw. All of du Plooy's losses were stoppages to known opponents such as Renaldo Snipes, Francesco Damiani, Pierre Coetzer, and Corrie Sanders. Du Plooy retired in 1993 after a win, and scored another comeback win in 1997 but promptly retired.

Death
Du Plooy became overweight after his retirement. He suffered from heart problems in the few years leading up to his death. Several months before his death, he had a heart attack.

Professional boxing record

|-
| style="text-align:center;" colspan="8"|27 Wins (22 knockouts, 5 decisions), 5 Losses (5 knockouts, 0 decisions), 1 Draw 
|-  style="text-align:center; background:#e3e3e3;"
|  style="border-style:none none solid solid; "|Result
|  style="border-style:none none solid solid; "|Record
|  style="border-style:none none solid solid; "|Opponent
|  style="border-style:none none solid solid; "|Type
|  style="border-style:none none solid solid; "|Round
|  style="border-style:none none solid solid; "|Date
|  style="border-style:none none solid solid; "|Location
|  style="border-style:none none solid solid; "|Notes
|- align=center
|Win
|
|align=left|Benjamin Manyube
|TKO
|2
|15 June 1997
|align=left| DLI Hall, Durban, KwaZulu-Natal, South Africa
|align=left|
|-
|Win
|
|align=left| Samson Mahlangu
|TKO
|6
|26 June 1993
|align=left| Superbowl, Sun City, Bophuthatswana
|align=left|
|-
|Loss
|
|align=left| Corrie Sanders
|KO
|1
|27 July 1991
|align=left| Superbowl, Sun City, Bophuthatswana
|align=left|
|-
|Win
|
|align=left| Philipp Brown
|UD
|8
|16 March 1991
|align=left| Palazzo Dello Sport, Saint-Vincent, Aosta Valley, Italy
|align=left|
|-
|Win
|
|align=left| Tim Tomashek
|TKO
|5
|8 November 1990
|align=left| Biloxi, Mississippi, United States
|align=left|
|-
|Loss
|
|align=left| Pierre Coetzer
|TKO
|2
|4 August 1990
|align=left| Superbowl, Sun City, Bophuthatswana
|align=left|
|-
|Win
|
|align=left| Lee Roy Murphy
|PTS
|10
|9 June 1990
|align=left| Superbowl, Sun City, Bophuthatswana
|align=left|
|-
|Loss
|
|align=left| Francesco Damiani
|KO
|3
|6 May 1989
|align=left| Syracuse, Sicily, Italy
|align=left|
|-
|Win
|
|align=left| Mike Rouse
|PTS
|10
|25 February 1989
|align=left| Superbowl, Sun City, Bophuthatswana
|align=left|
|-
|Win
|
|align=left| Everett Martin
|KO
|7
|18 December 1988
|align=left| Orlando, Florida, United States
|align=left|
|-
|Win
|
|align=left| James Pritchard
|TKO
|10
|22 October 1988
|align=left| Superbowl, Sun City, Bophuthatswana
|align=left|
|-
|Loss
|
|align=left| Renaldo Snipes
|TKO
|7
|12 August 1988
|align=left| Eagles Club, Milwaukee, Wisconsin, United States
|align=left|
|-
|Draw
|
|align=left| James Pritchard
|PTS
|10
|2 July 1988
|align=left| Superbowl, Sun City, Bophuthatswana
|align=left|
|-
|Win
|
|align=left| Mike Weaver
|KO
|2
|30 April 1988
|align=left| Superbowl, Sun City, Bophuthatswana
|align=left|
|-
|Win
|
|align=left| James Broad
|KO
|4
|27 February 1988
|align=left| Portuguese Hall, Johannesburg, Transvaal, South Africa
|align=left|
|-
|Loss
|
|align=left| Mike Weaver
|TKO
|7
|28 November 1987
|align=left| Rand Stadium, Johannesburg, Transvaal, South Africa
|align=left|
|-
|Win
|
|align=left| Ricky Parkey
|KO
|10
|31 October 1987
|align=left| Superbowl, Sun City, Bophuthatswana
|align=left|
|-
|Win
|
|align=left| Bennie Knoetze
|KO
|1
|12 September 1987
|align=left| Kwa Thema Civic Centre, Springs, Transvaal, South Africa
|align=left|
|-
|Win
|
|align=left| Tyrone Booze
|KO
|2
|27 July 1987
|align=left| Ellis Park Indoor Arena, Johannesburg, Transvaal, South Africa
|align=left|
|-
|Win
|
|align=left| James Tillis
|TKO
|10
|23 June 1987
|align=left| Ellis Park Indoor Arena, Johannesburg, Transvaal, South Africa
|align=left|
|-
|Win
|
|align=left| David Bey
|KO
|9
|27 April 1987
|align=left| Ellis Park Indoor Arena, Johannesburg, Transvaal, South Africa
|align=left|
|-
|Win
|
|align=left| K.P. Porter
|KO
|6
|7 February 1987
|align=left| Superbowl, Sun City, Bophuthatswana
|align=left|
|-
|Win
|
|align=left| David Jaco
|KO
|2
|22 November 1986
|align=left| Rand Stadium, Johannesburg, Transvaal, South Africa
|align=left|
|-
|Win
|
|align=left| Steve Zouski
|KO
|4
|30 October 1986
|align=left| Hartford Civic Center, Hartford, Connecticut, United States
|align=left|
|-
|Win
|
|align=left| Eddie Taylor
|TKO
|4
|6 October 1986
|align=left| Durban, Natal, South Africa
|align=left|
|-
|Win
|
|align=left| Mike Jameson
|PTS
|10
|1 September 1986
|align=left| West Ridge Park, Durban, Natal, South Africa
|align=left|
|-
|Win
|
|align=left| Stanley Ross
|PTS
|8
|14 May 1986
|align=left| Rand Stadium, Johannesburg, Transvaal, South Africa
|align=left|
|-
|Win
|
|align=left| Ron Ellis
|TKO
|2
|2 April 1986
|align=left| West Ridge Park, Durban, Natal, South Africa
|align=left|
|-
|Win
|
|align=left| Linus Willette
|TKO
|1
|19 February 1986
|align=left| Rand Stadium, Johannesburg, Transvaal, South Africa
|align=left|
|-
|Win
|
|align=left| Hannes van den Berg
|KO
|3
|18 December 1985
|align=left| Good Hope Centre, Cape Town, Cape Province, South Africa
|align=left|
|-
|Win
|
|align=left| Howard Mpepesi
|TKO
|5
|7 September 1985
|align=left| Ellis Park Stadium, Johannesburg, Transvaal, South Africa
|align=left|
|-
|Win
|
|align=left| Blessing Sibusiso Mbuyazi
|TKO
|1
|10 July 1985
|align=left| West Ridge Park, Durban, Natal, South Africa
|align=left|
|-
|Win
|
|align=left| Sophonia Naile
|TKO
|1
|27 April 1985
|align=left| Portuguese Hall, Johannesburg, Transvaal, South Africa
|align=left|
|}

References

External links

1964 births
Afrikaner people
South African people of Dutch descent
South African people of German descent
Sportspeople from Gauteng
Heavyweight boxers
2013 deaths
South African male boxers